This is a list of awards and nominations received by Gin Lee, a Hong Kong-based singer. She debuted in Malaysia in 2009 and in Hong Kong in 2010 as a Cantopop solo artist under BMA Records with the EP Here I Come. In 2014 she signed with Universal Music Hong Kong and made her fourth Cantonese release with the album beGin. Singles from beGin achieved major commercial success, and the album was certified gold by the Hong Kong Recording Industry Alliance less than two months after its release, eventually reaching plantinum.

AIM Chinese Music Awards 
AIM Chinese Music Awards (Chinese: AIM中文音乐颁奖典礼) is hosted by the Malaysian Recording Industry Association.

Cantonese Song Chart Awards Presentation 
The Cantonese Song Chart Awards Presentation (Chinese: 粵語歌曲排行榜頒獎典禮) is hosted by the Music FM Radio Guangdong 廣東廣播電視台音樂之聲FM93.9 since 2014.

Chinese Golden Melody Awards 
(Chinese: 华语金曲奖). Not to be confused with the Taiwan-based Golden Melody Awards.

Global Chinese Music Awards 
The Global Chinese Music Awards (Chinese: 全球华语歌曲排行榜颁奖典礼) is founded by seven Mandarin radio stations in 2001, including Hit FM, RTHK, East Radio Pop, Radio Guangdong, Beijing Yinyue Tai, YES 933, and 988 FM.

Metro Radio Hit Music Awards 
The Metro Radio Hit Music Awards (Chinese: 新城勁爆頒獎禮) is presented annually by Metro Broadcast Radio Station.

RTHK Top 10 Gold Songs Awards 
RTHK Top 10 Gold Songs Awards is held annually in Hong Kong since 1978. The awards are determined by Radio and Television Hong Kong based on the work of all Asian artists (mostly cantopop) for the previous year.

Ultimate Song Chart Awards 
The Ultimate Song Chart Awards Presentation (Chinese: 叱咤樂壇流行榜頒獎典禮) is a cantopop award ceremony hosted by Commercial Radio Hong Kong known as Ultimate 903 (FM 90.3).

Yahoo! Asia Buzz Awards

Reference List 

Lee, Gin